Shootin' Irons is a 1927 American silent Western film directed by Richard Rosson and starring Jack Luden, Sally Blane and Fred Kohler.

Cast
 Jack Luden as Pan Smith 
 Sally Blane as Lucy Blake 
 Fred Kohler as Dick Hardman 
 Richard Carlyle as Jim Blake 
 Loyal Underwood as Blinky 
 Guy Oliver as Judge Mathews 
 Scott McKee as Cook 
 Arthur Millett as Sheriff

References

Bibliography
 Munden, Kenneth White. The American Film Institute Catalog of Motion Pictures Produced in the United States, Part 1. University of California Press, 1997.

External links
 

1927 films
1927 Western (genre) films
Films directed by Richard Rosson
Paramount Pictures films
American black-and-white films
Silent American Western (genre) films
1920s English-language films
1920s American films